Sandringham is a village and civil parish in the north of the English county of Norfolk.

The village's name means 'Sandy Dersingham'. 'Dersingham' meaning 'Homestead/village of Deorsige's people'.

The civil parish extends eastwards from Sandringham village to the shore of the Wash some  distant, and includes the villages of West Newton and Wolferton. The population had increased to 437 at the 2011 Census. For the purposes of local government, the parish is in the district of King's Lynn and West Norfolk.

Sandringham is best known as the location of Sandringham House and its estate, a private residence of British monarchs since Edward VII, who used it as a holiday home. Near to the house is the Royal Stud, a stud farm that houses many of the royal horses. The village was the birthplace of Diana, Princess of Wales.

In terms of public transport, Sandringham is served by bus route 35 between King's Lynn and Hunstanton, operated by Lynx.

See also
HMS Sandringham

References

External links

 
 Information from Genuki Norfolk on Sandringham.
 
 Sandringham on the map

 
Villages in Norfolk
Civil parishes in Norfolk
King's Lynn and West Norfolk